The złoty (alternatively zloty; ; abbreviation: zł; code: PLN) is the official currency and legal tender of Poland. It is subdivided into 100 grosz (gr). It is the most traded currency in Central and Eastern Europe and ranks 21st most-traded in the foreign exchange market.

The word złoty is a masculine form of the Polish adjective 'golden', which closely relates with its name to the guilder whereas the grosz subunit was based on the groschen, cognate to the English word groat. It was officially introduced to replace its predecessor, the Polish marka, on 28 February 1919 and began circulation in 1924. The only body permitted to manufacture or mint złoty coins is Mennica Polska, founded in Warsaw on 10 February 1766.

As a result of inflation in the early 1990s, the currency underwent redenomination. Thus, on 1 January 1995, 10,000 old złoty (PLZ) became one new złoty (PLN). Since then, the currency has been relatively stable, with an exchange rate fluctuating between 4 and 5 złoty for a euro. As a member of the European Union, Poland is obligated to adopt the euro when all specific conditions are met, however there is no time limit for fulfilling all of them.

Name and plural forms
The term "złoty" is an adjective derived from the noun "złoto", which in the Polish language denotes gold. A literal translation of the currency's name would be "golden" or "the golden one". There are two plural forms – złote  as well as złotych , and their correct usage is as follows:

 1 – złoty or grosz  / 
 2...4; 22...24; 32...34 (...), 102...104, 122...124, 132...134, (...) – złote or grosze  / 
 0, 5...21; 25...31; 35...41 (...); 95...101; 105...121; 125...131; (...) – złotych or groszy  / 

Fractions should be rendered with złotego  and grosza , for example 0.1 złotego; 2.5 złotego and so on.

Native English speakers or English-language sources tend to avoid the complexity of plural forms and in turn use "złoty" for all denominations, for instance 2 złoty and 100 złoty instead of 2 złote and 100 złotych.

Symbol
The official currency symbol is zł, composed of lowercase z and ł which are the two first letters of "złoty". It has no representation in the Unicode Standard as a single sign, but previously it had representation in Polish typewriters and computers. The symbol of the "grosz" subunit is represented by lowercase gr.

History

First złoty

The first form of tangible currency in Poland was the denarius (denar), which circulated since the 10th century. During this period, Polish coinage had a single face value and was minted from bullion, primarily silver, but also compounded with copper and other precious metals. The standard unit of mass used at the time was the grzywna rather than the pound, with one grzywna being equivalent to 240 denars. From the 1300s to the mid-16th century, the Prague groschen (or groat) dominated the market and its high supply reduced the demand for a national currency across Central Europe. Certain cities and autonomous regions of the Polish Kingdom held the privilege of minting its own currency, for instance the shilling (szeląg) in the Duchy of Prussia, which Poland co-adopted in 1526.

Initially, the term "złoty" (lit. the golden one) was used in the 14th and 15th centuries for a number of foreign gold coins, most notably Venetian ducats, florins and guldens. In 1496, the Sejm parliament debated on the creation of a domestic currency and approved the złoty, which until then acted as a unit of account. An exchange rate of 30 grosz was imposed for one gold piece, which remained the traditional subdivision until the 19th century. In the years 1526–1535, as part of an extensive monetary reform proposed by Nicolaus Copernicus and Justus Decius, king Sigismund I defined the złoty as a legal tender in the minting ordinance on 16 February 1528.

The Polish monetary system stayed complex and intricate from the 16th to 18th centuries until a monetary reform was done by Stanisław II Augustus which removed all other monetary units except the złoty divided into 30 groszy. Polish currency was then linked to that of the Holy Roman Empire by setting the Conventionsthaler = 8 złoty = 23.3856 g fine silver and the North German thaler = 6 złoty = 17.5392 g silver (hence 2.9232 g silver in a złoty).

Radical changes to the currency were made during the Kościuszko Uprising. The second partition of the vast Polish–Lithuanian Commonwealth resulted in the loss of approximately 200,000 square kilometres of land and precipitated an economic collapse. The widespread shortage of funds to finance the defense of remaining territories forced the insurrectionist government to look for alternatives. In June 1794, Tadeusz Kościuszko began printing paper money and issuing first Polish banknotes as a substitute for coinage, which could not be minted in required quantities. These entered circulation on 13 August 1794.

The złoty remained in circulation after the Partitions of Poland and Napoleon's Duchy of Warsaw issued coins denominated in grosz, złoty and talars, with the talar (thaler) of 6 złoty slightly reduced in value to the Prussian thaler of 16.704 g fine silver (hence 2.784 g silver in a złoty). Talar banknotes were also issued. In 1813, while Zamość was under siege, the town authorities issued 6 grosz and 2 złoty coins. Following the 1815 Congress of Vienna, Austrian and Russian sectors of partitioned Poland continued to use the złoty for some time; whereas the German sector replaced the talar and złoty with the Prussian thaler and afterwards the German gold mark.

On 19 November O.S. (1 December N.S.) 1815, the law regarding the monetary system of Congress Poland (in Russia) was passed, which pegged the złoty at 15 kopecks (0.15 Imperial roubles, or almost 2.7 g fine silver) and the groszy at  kopeck, and with silver 1, 2, 5 and 10 złotych coins issued from 1816 to 1855.

At the time of the 1830 November Uprising, the insurrectionists issued their own "rebel money" – golden ducats and silver coins in the denomination of 2 and 5 złoty, with the revolutionary coat of arms, and the copper 3 and 10 grosz. These coins were still traded long after the uprising was quelled. As a consequence of the uprising, the rubel became the sole legal tender of Congress Poland since 1842, although coins marked as złoty in parallel with ruble were minted in Warsaw until 1865 and remained legal until 1890. In 1892 the Austro-Hungarian krone was introduced in Austrian Galicia. Between 1835 and 1846, the Free City of Kraków also used its own independent currency, the Kraków złoty, with the coins actually being made in Vienna, it remained legal until 1857.

During World War I, the rouble and krone were replaced by the Polish marka, a currency initially equivalent to the German mark. The marka stayed in use after Poland regained its independence in 1918, but was extremely unstable, disrupted the whole economy, and triggered galloping inflation.

Second złoty

The złoty was reintroduced by the Minister of Finance, Władysław Grabski, in April 1924. It replaced the marka at a rate of 1 złoty equaling 1,800,000 marks and was subdivided into 100 grosz, instead of the traditional 30 grosz, as it had been earlier.

Following its inauguration, the second złoty was pegged to the United States dollar through a stabilization loan provided by the Federal Reserve Bank of New York. The budget deficit ballooned and out-of-control inflation ensued. The złoty began to stabilise in 1926 (chiefly due to significant exports of coal), and was re-set on the dollar-złoty rate 50% higher than in 1924. Up to 1933 the złoty was freely exchanged into gold and foreign currency. Based on these developments, the Polish government made the decision to adopt the gold standard and maintain it for a significant period to attract global investors.

Under the occupation during World War II, the Germans created an Emissary Bank (Bank Emisyjny) in Kraków, as Polish bank officials fled to Paris in France. It started operating on 8 April 1940, and in May old banknotes from 1924 to 1939 were overstamped by the new entity. Money exchange was limited per individual; the limits varied according to the status of the person. The fixed exchange rate was 2 złoty per 1 Reichsmark. A new issue of notes appeared in the years 1940–1941.

On 15 January 1945 the National Bank of Poland was formed, and a new printing plant opened in Łódź. The series II and III notes were designed by Ryszard Kleczewski and Wacław Borowski. The first three series were taken out of circulation in line with legislation signed on 28 October 1950, covering the introduction of a new złoty with a revived coinage system.

Third złoty (PLZ)

In 1950, the third złoty was introduced, replacing all notes issued up to 1948 at a rate of one hundred to one, while all bank assets were re-denominated in the ratio 100:3. The new banknotes were dated in 1948, while the new coins were dated in 1949. Initially, by law with effect from 1950 1 złoty was worth 0.222168 grams of pure gold.

Fourth złoty (PLN)

With the fall of communism in 1989 and successive hyperinflation in 1990, the złoty had to be redenominated. On 11 May 1994 a redenomination project from the NBP was approved; the act allowing the project to come into force was ratified on 7 July 1994. Thus, on 1 January 1995 the old 10,000 PLZ became the new 1 PLN. Redesigned coins and banknotes were released, featuring Polish monarchs, which were printed by De La Rue in London (until 1997) and PWPW in Warsaw (from 1997).

Between 2013 and 2014, the banknotes received additional security features. The design does not differ greatly from the original 1994 series, but are distinguishable by the added white-coloured field with a watermark on the obverse. The updated notes also possess randomly arranged dotting, which are part of the EURion constellation.

On 10 February 2017, a 500zł banknote with the likeness of John III Sobieski began circulating. In 2021, Adam Glapiński, president of the National Bank of Poland, announced that a 1000zł note will be introduced in the near future.

Future of the złoty

One of the conditions of Poland's joining the European Union in May 2004 obliges the country to eventually adopt the euro, though not at any specific date and only after Poland meets the necessary stability criteria. Serious discussions regarding joining the Eurozone have ensued. However, article 227 of the Constitution of the Republic of Poland will need to be amended first. While opinion on the euro has not always been in favor, recent opinion polling on behalf of the European Commission has found around 60% support for adopting the Euro.

Banknotes
The banknotes range from 120 to 150 millimetres in length and from 60 to 75 millimetres in width. The length increases by 6mm and the width by 3mm with every higher denomination. The obverse features the left profile of a Polish monarch clothed in armour or royal regalia; the sovereigns are arranged chronologically based on the period of reign. The reverse illustrates important landmarks, early coinage or important objects from Poland's history. Architectural elements comprising portals, columns, windows or flower motifs are scattered throughout each banknote, both on the obverse and on the reverse. Predominant colours used include shades of brown, pink or purple, blue, green and gold. Face value is given in numerals in the upper-left and upper-right corners on the obverse, and in the upper-right corner on the reverse. The written form of the nominal value is embedded vertically on the obverse and horizontally on the reverse.

The notes are adorned by the shieldless coat of arms of the Republic of Poland, along with signatures of the President and General Treasurer of NBP – the National Bank of Poland.

Exchange rates

List of coins/banknotes

Diameter (Ø) shown in mm, mass in grams. 1 - Minted both in Budapest and Warsaw in numbers of 300,100,600 coins.

See also
 Commemorative coins of Poland
 Economy of Poland
 Historical coins and banknotes of Poland
 Poland and the euro
 Polish coins and banknotes

References

Footnotes

External links

 Banknotes from the 1970s in the case if Poland invaded western countries or the Polska Wytwórnia Papierów Wartościowych were ruined (video, in Polish)
 Polish złoty in 1939-1945 (in Polish)
 Banknotes issued by the NBP
 Coins issued by the NBP
 A fan-shaped 10 złoty commemorative coin released in 2004
 National Bank of Poland – Schedule of exchange rates
 "English" counterfeit banknote 500 zloty 1940 issued by Bank Emisyjny
 Chosen Polish banknotes
 Polish Zloty coins catalog information
 A numismatic catalog with over 650 Polish coins
 "NBP Safe" - official app dedicated to Polish money
 Trial banknotes of the third Polish złoty (in Polish)
 The Banknotes of Poland 

Currencies of Poland
Currency symbols